Georgy Timofeyevich Dobrovolsky (1 June 192829 June 1971) was a Soviet cosmonaut who commanded the three-man crew of the Soyuz 11 spacecraft. They became the world's first space station crew aboard Salyut 1, but died of asphyxiation because of an accidentally opened valve. They were the first and only humans to have died in space.

Biography 
Dobrovolsky,  Viktor Patsayev and Vladislav Volkov flew on the Soyuz 11 mission and were the world's third crew to die during a space flight.

After a normal re-entry, the capsule was opened and the crew was found dead. It was discovered that a valve had opened just prior to leaving orbit that had allowed the capsule's atmosphere to vent away into space, suffocating the crew.

Dobrovolsky's ashes were placed in an urn in the Kremlin Wall Necropolis on Red Square in Moscow. Among the pallbearers were Alexei Leonov (who had been the prime-crew commander scheduled to launch on Soyuz 11), Vladimir Shatalov, Andriyan Nikolayev, and American astronaut Thomas P. Stafford.  Dobrovolsky was posthumously awarded the title of Hero of the Soviet Union, the Order of Lenin, and the title of Pilot-Cosmonaut of the USSR.

References

Ukrainian Hero, School No. 10 entitled Dobrovol'skij, at the school a museum entitled

External links

 

1928 births
1971 deaths
Military personnel from Odesa
1971 in spaceflight
Deaths in space
Heroes of the Soviet Union
Burials at the Kremlin Wall Necropolis
Soviet cosmonauts
Soviet Air Force officers
Deaths from hypoxia
Salyut program cosmonauts